Bathytoma virgo is a species of sea snail, a marine gastropod mollusk in the family Borsoniidae.

Distribution
This marine species occurs off Japan.

Description

References

 Hasegawa K. & Okutani T. (2011) A review of bathyal shell-bearing gastropods in Sagami Bay. Memoirs of the National Sciences Museum, Tokyo 47: 97-144.

virgo